The Global Communications Conference (GLOBECOM) is an annual international academic conference organised by the Institute of Electrical and Electronics Engineers' Communications Society. The first GLOBECOM was organised by the Communications Society's predecessor in 1957, with the full name of "National Symposium on Global Communications". The seventh GLOBECOM, in 1965 was called the "IEEE Communications Convention" and after that the conference was renamed as the International Conference on Communications (ICC) and GLOBECOM was no longer organised.

By 1982, the need for a second annual international conference on communications was apparent, and so the IEEE National Telecommunications Conference was re-organised to be international in scope, and renamed to the "Global Communications Conference", resurrecting the GLOBECOM acronym. GLOBECOM has been held annually since.

Recent GLOBECOMs have been attended by about 1,500 people. IEE has more than 400,000 members in 150 countries.

Past and Upcoming Conferences

See also 
1912 London International Radiotelegraphic Convention
Communications

References 

IEEE conferences
Telecommunication conferences
Computer networking conferences